Relief Hose Company No. 2 Engine House is a two-story brick firehouse with a three-story tower located at 16 Anderson Street in the borough of Raritan in Somerset County, New Jersey, United States. The firehouse was built in 1894 and added to the National Register of Historic Places on December 14, 2000 for its significance in architecture. The building is a well-preserved example of a Victorian-era High Gothic style firehouse. The firehouse has hosted many municipal activities and at times housed Borough Council chambers and the public library. The building is still in use as an active firehouse. It currently houses The Raritan Fire Department's 2007 Seagrave Aerialscope Tower Ladder (52-121).

History
In 1892, the town purchased land to build the firehouse. It was designed by the architect J. Van Derbeck, built by A.R. Dilts, Hickey & Brady, and completed in 1894. The company raised their banner "Where duty calls, there you will find us." in the new building.

See also
 National Register of Historic Places listings in Somerset County, New Jersey
 West End Hose Company Number 3

References

External links
 

Raritan, New Jersey
Fire stations completed in 1894
Brick buildings and structures
Gothic Revival architecture in New Jersey
Buildings and structures in Somerset County, New Jersey
Fire stations on the National Register of Historic Places in New Jersey
National Register of Historic Places in Somerset County, New Jersey
New Jersey Register of Historic Places